World War II United States Merchant Navy was the largest civilian Navy in the world, which operated during World War II. With the United States fighting a world war in all the world oceans, the demand for cargo and fuel was very high.  Cargo and fuel was needed around the world for the United States Navy, United States Army, United States Marine Corps, United States Army Air Forces, United States Coast Guard and the support of the allied nations of the United States. American steamship companies chartered ships from the Maritime Commission and War Shipping Administration to meet the demand. Many United States Merchant Marine ships were newly built in the Emergency Shipbuilding Program, other ships were older World War I ships that were put back in service, or private ships acquired under Emergency war requisitions. The Merchant Navy operated in the Pacific War and European war. Over 200 US Merchant ships took part in the D-day Normandy landings. To make a Normandy breakwater Harbor, called Mulberry harbour, 33 merchant ships were sunk 1,000 yards from shore. Some of the ghosts merchant ships used were damaged and others were deemed too old.

Crew

The ships were operated by volunteer civilian crews, that were employed and trained by private shipping and passenger companies. Most ships had armament for self defense, most ships had deck guns manned by United States Navy Armed Guard from the US Navy Troops. The 144,857 strong Navy Armed Guards also operated the radio, semaphore-signal flags, and the signal lamp.  Navy Armed Guard were also training in first aid. United States Navy Armed Guard operated on 6,200 ships by the end of the war. Cross training with the ship's crew to cover roles was often completed. In 1943 the United States Merchant Marine Academy was founded train Merchant Marine officers.

Losses
Merchant Navy at its peak had over 215,000 men operating the Merchant Navy ships. The losses by the end of the war was 8,651 crew deaths. Merchant Marine were killed at a per capita rate much higher than those of the combined United States Armed Forces. Merchant Navy crews were killed at a rate of 1 in 26 (US Navy rate was 1 in 114). The greatest lose was in the Battle of the Atlantic due to U-boat torpedo or deck gun attacks. During the war 3.1 million tons of US merchant ships were sunk in 733 ships. Merchant ships were lost due to submarines, destroyers, naval mines, armed raiders, gun boats, aircraft attacks, kamikaze attacks, grounding and ocean storms. Convoy system with destroyers, escort carriers, submarine chasers, planes and other support, reduced losses by 1944. Merchant Navy ship sunk or captured by Imperial Japan caused 609 crewmen to be  captured as prisoners of war, many died in prison.

Ships

The Emergency Shipbuilding Program built many types of ships to support the war. The most numerous ships were the 2,710 cargo Liberty ships. Liberty ships were built between 1941 and 1945, with a new module assembly process so that about three ships were built every two days. Victory ships were a faster replacement ship for the Merchant Navy. Between 1944 and 1946, 531 Victory ships were built, with some to the US Navy and 414 to the Merchant Navy.
The Merchant Navy also operated: other cargo ships like: Type N3, Type C1, Type C2, Type C3, and the largest Type C4. Merchant Navy operated tanker ships like: T1 tanker, T2 tanker and the largest T3 Tankers for fuel oil, aviation gasoline, and Diesel fuel. Merchant Navy operated special ships like: Type L6, called Lakers, Type P1 small Passenger ships, Type P2 Passenger, Type R, refrigerated cargo ships, Type B Barges and Type V Tugboats. The Merchant Navy operated Troopships, both passenger ships and cargo ships converted to troopships. For World War II 97 Victory ships temporarily were converted to troopship. By the end of the war over 11,000 ships were under the control of the War Shipping Administration.

Many World War 2 surplus merchant ships were removed from the National Defense Reserve Fleet and put into action to support the Korean War and Vietnam War.

Post war
At the end of the war, the US Merchant Navy was given the task of helping bring Troops and for some their war brides home, called Operation Magic Carpet. Some traveled on Navy ships, but many of the 3,500,000 men and women came home on Merchant Navy ships, call troopships. Some of the US Merchant Navy continued in post-war relief efforts and general cargo shipping to help nations around the world recover from the devastating war. The Seagoing cowboys did United Nations Relief and Rehabilitation work from 1945 to 1947. Seagoing cowboys use cargo ships with added cages and horse stalls to take livestock to war-torn nations. Many merchant ships were placed in the Reserve Fleet after the war, some were sold, many scrapped and a few became museum ships.

Legacy
American Merchant Marine Veterans Memorial in San Pedro, California.
World War II Merchant Marine Memorial Coyote Point Park in San Mateo County, California
American Merchant Mariner's Memorial in Battery Park, New York Harbor
Navy – Merchant Marine Memorial in Washington, D.C.
Action in the North Atlantic 1943 movie with Humphrey Bogart.
The Rebels of PT-218, (The Rebels of World War II) a 2021 movie about the a Liberty ship that became a war ship.
The Men Who Sailed the Liberty Ships Film of Veterans of the American merchant marine in World War II  tell their story.
Forgotten Victory  SS Lane Victory 2021 Documentary 
Onboard a Liberty Ship, 1940s US Navy, WWII US Navy color film
SS Hannibal Victory 1945 Documentary film.
List of United States Merchant Navy Film and TV shows
Rosie the Riveter World War II Home Front National Historical Park

Notable ships
's crew were the first American casualties of the war on 8 AM on December 7, 1940.
SS Jean Nicolet, torpedoed by a Japanese submarine I-8 on July 2, 1944, off Ceylon. Crew saved and then most killed by Japanese.
Ships of Convoy PQ 17, 24 merchant ships sunk and 153 merchant mariners killed in 1942.
 had a munitions explosion on July 17, 1944, at Port Chicago, California.
 was built in 4 days, 15 hours and 29 minutes, a record.
, the last Liberty ship built, is now the headquarters of Trident Seafoods in Kodiak, Alaska.
SS Ohio was attacked in a Malta convoy and was still able to deliver needed fuel in Operation Pedestal to Malta (called the saviour of the beleaguered island).
   sank the German commerce raider Stier in a ship-to-ship gun battle in 1942.
   and SS Winthrop Victory were present in Tokyo Bay on Victory over Japan Day on September 2, 1945.
 became a war ship in the Battle of Anzio, an eight-day battle the ship shot down five German planes.

Ship operators

At its peak, about 130 companies served as ship operators for the War Shipping Administration.
American steamship companies operating merchant ships in World War II:

Tanker operators

American steamship companies operating merchant tanker ships in World War II:

See also

Merchant Marine Act of 1936
James River, Reserve Fleet
History of the United States Merchant Marine
 Awards and decorations of the United States Merchant Marine
 United States Maritime Service
 Merchant Navy (United Kingdom)
 Royal Fleet Auxiliary
 The Marine Society
 United States home front during World War II

External links
youtube How A Cargo Ship Helped Win WW2: The Liberty Ship Story
American Merchant Marine at War 
Casualty statistics World War II 
Recipients of Merchant Marine Distinguished Service Medal
United States Merchant Marine in history
ibiblio.org United States Maritime Commission
ibiblio.org Defense of Merchant Navy 
ibiblio.org, US Armed Guards

References

Liberty ships
Victory ships
Maritime history of the United States